Apapátaro is a village in the Mexican state of Querétaro. It is located in the municipality of Huimilpan. It has 1141 inhabitants, and is located at 1970 meters above sea level.

References

Populated places in Querétaro